Prentice v. Stearns, 113 U.S. 435 (1885), was an action to recover possession of real estate and damages for its detention, the plaintiff in error being plaintiff below, and a citizen of Ohio, the defendant being a citizen of Minnesota, specifically recovery of real estate deeded from an Indian chief to A, in 1858, of a tract described by metes and bounds and further as:

did not convey the equitable interest of the chief in another tract described by different metes and bounds, granted to the said chief by a subsequent patent in 1858 in conformity with the said treaty in such manner that an action at law may be maintained by A or his grantee for recovering possession of the same.

This description, thus remaining, refers to land already at the date of the deed set off to the Indian chief Buffalo and described in an existing document in the archives of the government, and cannot possibly therefore embrace the tract subsequently selected and designated and described in the patent of October 23, 1858. And the references which must be relied on to furnish any description whatever for the land conveyed by the deed, when applied, result simply in restoring to the deed the particular description by boundaries which for imputed error had for purposes of interpretation been struck out.

The case is not one to which the maxim invoked for the construction of the deed can be applied. That rule of interpretation, which rejects erroneous particulars of description where what is left sufficiently identifies the subject of the grant, is adopted in aid of the intention of the grantor, as gathered from the instrument itself, read in the light of the circumstances in which it was written. But here it is expressly found as a fact by the court, in reference to the land originally selected by Buffalo and described in the deed from Armstrong to the plaintiff,

and

So that the description of the land in the deed which it is sought to reject, because it is inconsistent with that of the patent, is an accurate and not an erroneous description of the land intended by the parties to be embraced and conveyed by the deed from Armstrong to the plaintiff.

It followed that there was no error in the judgment of the circuit court, and it was accordingly affirmed.

See also
List of United States Supreme Court cases, volume 113

References

External links
 

United States Supreme Court cases
United States Supreme Court cases of the Waite Court
1885 in United States case law